Galeh Rud (also Romanized as Galeh Rūd and Golahrūd) is a village in Taham Rural District, in the Central District of Zanjan County, Zanjan Province, Iran. At the 2006 census, its population was 199, in 51 families.

References 

Populated places in Zanjan County